The National Security Law of the People's Republic of China, which was issued on July 1, 2015, is a Chinese law made up of 7 sections containing 84 articles.  PRC authorities say that the law can protect national security of the PRC effectively and the media controlled by the authority praise the law, while some analysts argue that the authorities can restrict Chinese people's freedom with this law.

Annette Lu, the former Vice President of Taiwan, said that the law is an offense to Taiwan, and some people from Hong Kong have expressed concern about their safety while in the Mainland China after it was issued.

A similar law has been taken effect in Hong Kong in July 2020 as Hong Kong national security law.

History 
The law was enacted by the Standing Committee of the National People's Congress on July 7, 2015 and implemented on the same date. The law is part of a series of laws implemented under Chinese Communist Party General Secretary Xi Jinping's administration as part of efforts to strengthen national security. After its passage, Alan Leong, a pro-democracy lawmaker in Hong Kong, told the broadcaster RTHK that the law “can be considered as giving pressure to Hong Kong” to enact its own security law.

See also 

 National Security Commission of the Chinese Communist Party

References

External links 
 PRC Government's translation of Articles 1-24
 Unofficial translation of all Articles of the National Security Law of the PRC 2015

Law of the People's Republic of China
National security policies